Brinke Stevens (born Charlene Elizabeth Brinkman, September 20, 1954) is an American actress, model, and writer. A native of San Diego, Stevens initially pursued a career as a marine biologist prior to becoming an actress, earning an undergraduate degree in biology from San Diego State University before studying marine biology at the Scripps Institution of Oceanography. Unable to find employment in the field of biology, Stevens began modeling in Los Angeles in 1980, and she worked as a film extra.

Her first major film role was in the slasher film The Slumber Party Massacre (1982). She went on to appear in a number of horror films, including Sorority Babes in the Slimeball Bowl-O-Rama (1988), Nightmare Sisters (1988), Grandmother's House (1988), and Mommy (1995).

In addition to acting, Stevens has co-written several films, including the comedy horror feature Teenage Exorcist (1991).

Biography

Early life and education
Stevens was born Charlene Elizabeth Brinkman on September 20, 1954 in San Diego to Charles Brinkman II, an aircraft riveter, and Lorraine Brinkman. She is of German and Mongolian descent. Stevens was raised in Crest, California along with her brother, Kerry. She graduated from Granite Hills High School in El Cajon, and was a gifted student, becoming a member of Mensa International while still in high school. As a teenager, she was a fan of Star Trek, and frequently attended sci-fi-themed conventions. In 1974, Stevens attended San Diego Comic Con and won first place in the first Masquerade Ball. She remained involved in running the masquerade at Comic Con for years after her win.

She earned a B.S. degree in biology and psychology from San Diego State University before enrolling to study marine biology at the Scripps Institution of Oceanography in La Jolla, California, aspiring to become a marine biologist. Stevens planned to pursue a PhD at the institute, but was barred from completing when it was uncovered that she had incorporated dolphins at SeaWorld as part of her studies, violating the institute's authorization that had given her clearance only to study the vision of seals. Despite this, she was later granted an honorary doctorate.

Modeling and film beginnings
Stevens subsequently relocated with her then-husband, comic illustrator Dave Stevens (whom she met in college) to Los Angeles in 1980, and served as a model for the character of Betty in Stevens' comic series Rocketeer. After the couple divorced in 1981, Brinke, unable to find employment in the field of biology, began working as a film extra for income. Photographer Dan Golden saw a photograph of her in costume, and hired her for a non-speaking role in the student film Zyzak Is King (1980); he also later photographed her for the cover of the first issue of Femme Fatales (1992).

While leaving a modeling agency, Stevens stopped by an office door to look at film posters on the walls. The occupant, Jacob Bressler, told her to enter and asked for her portfolio. On the basis of that, he cast her in an uncredited, non-speaking role in ...All the Marbles (1981). Stevens' first speaking role was as Linda Dawn Grant in The Slumber Party Massacre (1982), a role she reprised in Cheerleader Massacre (2003).

Stevens has appeared in more than 100 feature films, primarily in the genres of horror, science fiction, and fantasy film. She has gained notoriety as a scream queen.

In addition to acting, Stevens has co-written a number of screenplays, co-produced two documentaries, and served as an onset decorator. She co-wrote  Teenage Exorcist (1991), in which she also appeared.

Later work
Stevens portrayed Julie Quinn, mother of serial killer Wayne Montgomery, in the 2007 horror film Head Case. She reprised her role in the three sequels, 2009's The Ritual, 2010's Post-Mortem, and 2013's Head Cases: Serial Killers in the Delaware Valley.

Stevens is depicted in the horror novel Bad Moon Rising, the third installment of Jonathan Maberry's "Pine Deep" trilogy, alongside Jim O'Rear, Tom Savini, and Debbie Rochon, published in 2008.

More recently she has appeared in a 2009 documentary Pretty Bloody: The Women of Horror and appeared in the 2013 remake of Die Sister, Die!. Alongside regular co-stars  Linnea Quigley, and Michelle Bauer, Stevens appeared in and was a main subject for the 2011 documentary Screaming in High Heels: The Rise & Fall of the Scream Queen Era and its 2020 follow up Screaming in High Heels: The Reunion.

Stevens narrated the 2021 Sirius XM podcast limited series, Comic-Con Begins: Origin Stories of the San Diego Comic-Con and the Rise of Modern Fandom.

Filmography

References

Sources

External links

1954 births
Actresses from San Diego
American film actresses
American people of German descent
American people of Mongolian descent
Cosplayers
Living people
Mensans
San Diego State University alumni
Scripps Institution of Oceanography alumni
Writers from San Diego
20th-century American actresses
21st-century American actresses
20th-century American writers
21st-century American writers
21st-century American women writers
20th-century American women writers